PTS (Paratroopers Training School) is a school in Agra, Uttar Pradesh for the training of paratroopers in the Indian Army.  PTS was founded in Agra in 1948.

History 

In October, 1941, the 50th Indian Parachute Brigade was formed at Delhi.  At the same time, the Air Landing School, the predecessor to PTS,  was established at Willingdon Airport in New Delhi. Lt AG Rangaraj, IMS and Havaldar Major Mathura Singh of 152 (Indian) Parachute Battalion became the first Indians to be trained and jump.

In 1942, the Air Landing School was renamed No 3 PTS, AF and moved to Chaklala in what is today Pakistan. In 1944 Dakota, Valencia Hudson Wellington and Halifax aircraft were used to transport the paratroopers.

The Partition of India led to the Indian element of PJIs under Sqn Ldr TS Gopalan moving to Agra and the creation of the current school facility.

Awards 

Sqn Ldr M Vanian and Flt Lt P Venugopal of PTS have awarded Shaurya Chakra.

References

Indian Air Force
Education in Agra